The Roman Catholic Diocese of Qingdao/Tsingtao is a Latin suffragan diocese in the Ecclesiastical province of the Metropolitan of Jinan.

Its cathedral episcopal see is the Cathedral of St. Michael in the city of Qingdao, in Shandong.

History 
 Established on 11 February 1925 as Apostolic Prefecture of Qingdao, on territory split off from the Apostolic Vicariate of Yanzhoufu
 On 14 June 1928 it was promoted as Apostolic Vicariate of Qingdao, remaining a pre-diocesan jurisdiction (exempt, i.e. directly subject to the Holy See), but now entitled to a [titular bishop].
 On 1 July 1937, it lost territory to establish the Apostolic Vicariate of Yizhoufu
 11 April 1946: Promoted as Diocese of Qingdao.

Ordinaries 
(all Roman Rite) Apostolic Prefects of Qingdao Georg Weig, Divine Word Missionaries (S.V.D.) (18 March 1925–14 June 1928 see below) Apostolic Vicars of Qingdao Georg Weig, S.V.D. (see above 14 June 1928–1941), Titular Bishop of Antandrus (1928.06.14–1941.10.03)
 Thomas (Cardinal) Tien-ken-sin, S.V.D. (10 November 1942–11 April 1946), Titular Bishop of Ruspæ (1939.07.11 –1946.02.18), previously Apostolic Prefect of Yanggu (China) (1934.02.23–1939.07.11), promoted Apostolic Vicar of Yanggu (1939.07.11–1942.11.10); later Cardinal-Priest of Santa Maria in Via (1946.02.22–1967.07.24), Metropolitan Archbishop of Beijing ) (China) (1946.04.11–1967.07.24) and Apostolic Administrator of Taipei ) (Taiwan) (1959.12.16–1966.02.15)Suffragan Bishops of Qingdao Faustino M. Tissot, Xaverian Missionary Fathers (S.X.) (1946–1947), later Bishop of Zhengzhou (China) (1946.05.10–1983)
 Augustin Olbert, S.V.D. (8 July 1948–18 November 1964)
 uncanonical: Paul Han Xirang, Friars Minor (O.F.M.), consecrated without papal mandate (1988–1992.03.06)
 Joseph Li Mingshu (August 2000–15 June 2018)
Thomas Chen Tianhao (2020-)

References

Source and External links 
 GigaCatholic, with incumbent biography links
 Catholic Hierarchy

Roman Catholic dioceses in China
Christian organizations established in 1925
Roman Catholic dioceses and prelatures established in the 20th century
Religion in Shandong
Qingdao